Longtan Township is a township in Yuanjiang Hani, Yi and Dai Autonomous County, Yunnan, China.

Administrative division
As of 2016, the township is divided into one community and six villages: 
 Anlong Community
 Dashao
 Shuikemo
 Deng'er
 Takezhi
 Yijiachong
 Anai

Geography
The township sits at the eastern Yuanjiang Hani, Yi and Dai Autonomous County. It is surrounded by Ganzhuang Subdistrict on the northwest, Shiping County on the northeast, Wadie Township on the southeast, and Lijiang Subdistrict on the southwest.

The highest point is Mount Qintian, elevation 

There are five major streams in the township, namely the Deng'er Stream, Luyechong Stream, Anaichong Stream, Dazhujing Stream, and Xiangjiaochong Stream.

Economy
The economy of the township has a predominantly agricultural orientation, including farming and pig-breeding. Significant crops include rice, wheat, and corn. Tobacco, sugarcane, and rape are the economic plants of this region.
The region abounds with iron, lead, zinc, silver, and silicon.

References

Bibliography

Divisions of Yuanjiang Hani, Yi and Dai Autonomous County